Lochiel is an unincorporated community in Union Township, Benton County, in the U.S. state of Indiana.

History
A post office at Lochiel was established in 1883, and remained in operation until it was discontinued in 1907. The community was named after Clan Cameron, also known as Lochiel.

Geography

References

Unincorporated communities in Indiana
Unincorporated communities in Benton County, Indiana